Richard Edward Dennett was an English trader operating out of the Kongo (present day Republic of Congo) in the early 20th century who wrote a number of books that were influential on sociological and anthropological research on the cultures of West Africa.

Bibliography

 Seven years among the Fjort; Being an English trader's experiences in the Congo district (S. Low, Marston, Searle, & Rivington, 1887)
 At the Back of the Black Man's Mind; Or, Notes on the kingly office in West Africa (Cass library of African studies, 1906)
 Nigerian studies; Or, The religious and political system of the Yoruba (Cass library of African studies, 1910)
 My Yoruba alphabet (Macmillan, 1916)
 Notes on the Folklore of the Fjort (French Congo) (Publications of the Folklore Society. 41, 1967)
 "The Congo: from a trader's point of view," Journal of the Manchester Geographical Society, 1886, pp. 283–306.
 "From Banana, at the Mouth of the Congo, to Boma; etc. [Letters by R.E. Dennet]," Journal of the Manchester Geographical Society, 1887, pp. 112–23.
 "The Fjort: the Manners and Customs of the native Congo People," The Journal of the Manchester Geographical Society, 1890, 1, pp. 26–29.
 "Death and Burial of the Fiote," Folklore, 8, 1897, pp. 132–137.
 "Laws and Customs of the Fjort or Bavili Family, Kingdom of Loango," Journal of the African Society, 3, April 1902, pp. 259–87.
 "The religion of the Fjort or Fiote: 'Mavungu'," Journal of the African Society, 1901–02, pp. 452–54. 
 "King Maluango's Court," Journal of the African Society, 1903–04, pp. 154–58.
 "The Court of the Slave Mamboma," Journal of the African Society, 1903–04, pp. 159–62.
 "A few Notes on the History of Loango (Northern Portion of Congo Coast)," Journal of the African Society, 1903–04, pp. 277–80.
 "Bavili Notes," Folklore, 16, 1905, pp. 371–406.

British anthropologists